Native Hawaiians (also known as Indigenous Hawaiians, Kānaka Maoli, Aboriginal Hawaiians, or simply Hawaiians; , , , and ) are the indigenous Polynesian people of the Hawaiian Islands.

Hawaii was settled at least 800 years ago with the voyage of Polynesians from the Society Islands. The settlers gradually became detached from their original homeland and developed a distinct Hawaiian culture and identity in their new isolated home. That included the creation of new religious and cultural structures, mostly in response to the new living environment and the need for a structured belief system through which to pass on knowledge. Hence, the Hawaiian religion focuses on ways to live and relate to the land and instills a sense of communal living as well as a specialized spatial awareness.

The Hawaiian Kingdom was formed in 1795, when Kamehameha the Great, of the independent island of Hawaiʻi, conquered the independent islands of Oʻahu, Maui, Molokaʻi, and Lānaʻi and unified them. In 1810, the whole Hawaiian archipelago became unified when Kauaʻi and Niʻihau joined the Kingdom. The Kingdom saw an influx of immigrants from the United States and Asia. The Kingdom became a Republic following its overthrow in 1893, and was annexed by the United States in 1898. An ongoing Hawaiian sovereignty movement exists seeking autonomy or independence for the state of Hawaii.

In the 2010 U.S. census, People with Native Hawaiian ancestry reported as residents in all 50 of the U.S. States, as well as Washington D.C. and Puerto Rico. Within the U.S. in 2010 540,013 residents reported Native Hawaiian or Other Pacific Islander alone in 2010, of which 135,422 lived in the State of Hawaii. In the United States overall, 1.2 million people identified as Native Hawaiian and Other Pacific Islander, either alone or in combination with one or more other races. The Native Hawaiian and Other Pacific Islander population was one of the fastest-growing race groups between 2000 and 2010 in the United States.

History

The history of Native Hawaiians, like the history of Hawaii, is commonly classified into four major periods:
 the pre-unification period (before )
 the unified monarchy and republic period ( to 1898)
 the U.S. territorial period (1898 to 1959)
 the U.S. statehood period (1959 to present)

Origins
One theory is that the first Polynesians arrived in Hawaii in the 3rd century from the Marquesas by travelling in groups of waka, and were followed by Tahitians in AD 1300, who then conquered the original inhabitants. Another is that a single, extended period of settlement populated the islands.
Evidence for a Tahitian conquest of the islands include the legends of Hawaiiloa and the navigator-priest Paao, who is said to have made a voyage between Hawaii and the island of "Kahiki" (Tahiti) and introduced many customs. Early historians, such as Abraham Fornander and Martha Beckwith, subscribed to this Tahitian invasion theory, but later historians, such as Patrick Kirch, do not mention it. King Kalākaua claimed that Paao was from Samoa.

Some writers claim that other settlers in Hawaii were forced into remote valleys by newer arrivals. They claim that stories about the Menehune, little people who built heiau and fishponds, prove the existence of ancient peoples who settled the islands before the Hawaiians, but similar stories exist throughout Polynesia.

Demographics

At the time of Captain Cook's arrival in 1778, the population is estimated to have been between 250,000 and 800,000. This is the peak population of singularly Native Hawaiian people on the islands, with the 293,000 of today being made of both dual lineage Native Hawaiian and mixed lineage/ multi-racial Native Hawaiians. This was also the highest number of any Native Hawaiians living on the island until 2014, a period of almost 226 years. This long spread was marked by a die-off of 1-in-17 Native Hawaiians, to begin with, which would gradually increase to almost 8–10 Hawaiians having died from the first contact to the lowest demographic total in 1950. Over the span of the first century after the first contact, the native Hawaiians were nearly wiped out by diseases introduced to the islands. Native Hawaiians had no resistance to influenza, smallpox, measles, or whooping cough, among others. These diseases were similarly catastrophic to indigenous populations in the continental United States, and show a larger trend of violence and disease wiping out native people. The 1900 U.S. Census identified 37,656 residents of full or partial native Hawaiian ancestry.

Some Hawaiians left the islands during the period of the Kingdom of Hawaii like Harry Maitey, who became the first Hawaiian in Prussia. Over the span of the first century after the first contact, the native Hawaiians were nearly wiped out by diseases introduced to the islands. The 2000 U.S. Census identified 283,430 residents of Native Hawaiian or Pacific Islander ancestry, showing a dramatic growth trend since annexation by the U.S. in 1898. This rapid increase in population has also occurred outside of the island, with many of the populations in California and Washington experiencing dramatic increases in total population. This has been part of the larger Hawaiian cultural revival and reflects an important resurgence in the presence of Native Hawaiians in the fabric of modern island life.

Religion and cultural practice

The Native Hawaiians initially began with a culture that was similar to their Polynesian roots, but with time and isolation began to develop their own religion and cultural practices. This new worship centered on the ideas of land (aina) and family (ohana) with land being held as a sacred part of life and family going beyond blood. These concepts are very different from Western views of familial structure and ownership. Much of this changed during the imperialist allotment system, and familial relations were also changed by US settler policies. The Hawaiian religion is polytheistic but mostly focuses on two gods. These are Wākea and Papahānaumoku, the mother and father of the Hawaiian islands, whose stillborn child formed the deep roots of Hawaii, and whose second child, Hāloa, is the god from which all Hawaiians originate.

Hawaiian culture is deeply caste-oriented, with definitive roles for people based on their pre-ascribed social standing. This is also reflected in their land system, with moku, tracts of land given to people of high standing and is kept within the family, being split into smaller ahupua'a, which extend from the sea to the mountains, ensuring that each tract of land includes all necessary resources for survival, including hardwoods and food sources. The ahupua'a is managed by managers, who are charged by the chief to collect tributes from each tract. Specialized splits of the ahupua'a are based on the level of tribute, with the major split being 'Ili. 'Ili give a small tribute to the chief of the ahupua'a and another to the chief of the island. This is a form of tax, as well as a condition of the caste oriented land system. This is often compared to the European system of feudalism, which is incorrect, as native Hawaiian peasants were never bound to the land as in the European system and were in fact free to move between ahupua’a as they saw fit.

Native Hawaiians refer to themselves as kama'aina, a word meaning "people of the land", not just because of the connection to the land and their stewardship of it, but as part of the spiritual belief system that holds Native Hawaiian origin to the island itself. This is reinforced by the taro plant, a crop that is said to be the manifestation of Hāloa, the stillborn son of Papa and Wakea. The taro plant comes to represent the deep root network that tethers Hawaiians to the island, as well as symbolizing the branching networks of the currently living Hawaiian people.

The struggle to preserve Native Hawaiian culture is apparent in the schooling system that centers indigenous knowledge and language, as well as activism to preserve traditional landholdings. Much of the Hawaiian culture has been commodified, with hula dancers and symbols being mass-produced for non-Hawaiian consumption, which some scholars like Haunani-Kay Trask have considered prostitution of Hawaiian traditions. This also includes things like the use of the word "Aloha", and the assimilation of Hawaiian culture into non-native lifestyles. For many Native Hawaiians, this is a difficult situation as the financial incentive offers a chance to escape joblessness, poverty, and complete erasure, while also allowing the dilution of cultural practice.

Culture and arts

Several cultural preservation societies and organizations have been established over the course of the 20th century. The largest of those institutions is the Bernice Pauahi Bishop Museum, established in 1889 and designated as the Hawaiʻi State Museum of Natural and Cultural History. The Bishop Museum houses the largest collection of native Hawaiian artifacts, documents, and other information available for educational use. Most objects are held for preservation alone. The museum has links with major colleges and universities throughout the world to facilitate research.

With the support of the Bishop Museum, the Polynesian Voyaging Society's double-hulled canoe, Hōkūlea, has contributed to rediscovery of native Hawaiian culture, especially in the revival of celestial navigation, by which ancient Polynesians originally settled Hawaiʻi.
 
One of the most commonly known arts of Hawaii is hula dancing. Traditionally, hula was a religious ritualistic dance that was more about honoring the gods and goddesses than about entertainment. In the 21st century, many people recognize the hula dance in two different categories, which are Hula Kahiko and Hula ʻAuana.

Hula Kahiko, which is an "old" style of the hula dancing that is an interpretive dance, famous for its grace and romantic feel, that expresses stories and feeling from almost any phase of life and culture of Hawaiians. While dancing, they also use percussion instruments and traditional chanting. Hawaiians make their own traditional instruments to use while the dancers are dancing. These include the pahu hula, kilu or puniu, ipu, hano or phe hano ihu, ka, pu, oeoe, pahupahu kaekeeke, hokio, and wi. Dancers employ implements to create sounds. Some of the traditional hula implements are uliuli, puili, iliili, papahehi, and kalaau.

Hula ʻAuana is a hula that was changed by Western influences and performed with musical instruments that do not originate from the Hawaiian Islands. It was popularized and influenced by the influx of tourists to the Hawaiian Islands. The stories are told primarily with the movements of the body and hands, music, and ukuleles and guitars to accompany the dancers. The entire performance makes it more entertaining for those who are new to the culture.

The Hawaiian people have various traditions and holidays they celebrate annually. One of the most important holidays is Prince Kuhio Day. Celebrated every year since 1949 on his birthday (March 26), Prince Kuhio Day honors Prince Jonah Kūhiō Kalanianaʻole, a Congressman who succeeded in helping Native Hawaiian families become public landowners. It is celebrated with canoe races and luaus across the islands of Hawaii. The most popular and well-known form of celebration in Hawaii are luaus. A luau is a traditional Hawaiian banquet, commonly featuring food such as poi, poke, lomi-lomi salmon, kalua pig, haupia, and classic Hawaiian entertainment like ukulele music and hula. Every June 11 Native Hawaiians celebrate King Kamehameha day. Kamehameha was the king who unified Niʻihau, Kauaʻi, Oʻahu, Molokaʻi, Lānaʻi, Kahoʻolawe, Maui, and Hawaiʻi under one flag and established the Kingdom of Hawaiʻi. He was also known as a fearless warrior, wise diplomat, and the most respected leader in the history of the Hawaiian monarchy. The holiday is celebrated with parades and lei draping ceremonies, where Native Hawaiians bring lei to the multiple King Kamehameha statues located across the islands and drape them from his cast bronze arms and neck to honor his contributions to the people of Hawaiʻi.

Hawaiian cultural revival

Native Hawaiian culture has seen a revival in recent years as an outgrowth of decisions made at the 1978 Hawaiʻi State Constitutional Convention, held 200 years after the arrival of Captain Cook. At the convention, the Hawaiʻi state government committed itself to a progressive study and preservation of native Hawaiian culture, history, and language.

A comprehensive Hawaiian culture curriculum was introduced into the State of Hawaiʻi's public elementary schools teaching: ancient Hawaiian art, lifestyle, geography, hula, and Hawaiian language vocabulary. Intermediate and high schools were mandated to impose two sets of Hawaiian history curricula on every candidate for graduation.

Statutes and charter amendments were passed acknowledging a policy of preference for Hawaiian place and street names. For example, with the closure of Barbers Point Naval Air Station in the 1990s, the region formerly occupied by the base was renamed Kalaeloa.

Activism

While Native Hawaiian protest has a long history, beginning just after the overthrow of the Hawaiian Kingdom, many of the most notable struggles and protest movements by Native Hawaiians were conducted during or after the Hawaiian cultural revival. These include the Kalama Valley protests, the Waiāhole-Waikāne struggle, the Kahoolawe protests, and the Thirty Meter Telescope protests.

Hawaiian language

Hawaiian Traditional Language
The Hawaiian language (or ʻŌlelo Hawaiʻi) was once the primary language of the native Hawaiian people; today, native Hawaiians predominantly speak the English language. A major factor for this change was an 1896 law that required that English "be the only medium and basis of instruction in all public and private schools". This law prevented the Hawaiian language from being taught as a second language. In spite of this, some Native Hawaiians (as well as non-Native Hawaiians) have learned ʻŌlelo as a second language. As with others local to Hawaii, Native Hawaiians often speak Hawaiian Creole English (referred to in Hawaiʻi as Pidgin), a creole which developed during Hawaiʻi's plantation era in the late nineteenth and early twentieth centuries with the influence of the various ethnic groups living in Hawaii during that time.

Nowadays, ʻŌlelo Hawaiʻi is the official language of the State of Hawaii, alongside English. The Hawaiian language has been promoted for revival most recently by a state program of cultural preservation enacted in 1978. Programs included the opening of Hawaiian language immersion schools, and the establishment of a Hawaiian language department at the University of Hawaiʻi at Mānoa. As a result, Hawaiian language learning has climbed among all races in Hawaiʻi.

In 2006, the University of Hawaiʻi at Hilo established a masters program in the Hawaiian Language. In fall 2006, they established a doctoral (Ph.D) program in the Hawaiian Language. In addition to being the first doctoral program for the study of Hawaiian, it is the first doctoral program established for the study of any native language in the United States of America.

Hawaiian is still spoken as the primary language by the residents on the private island of Niʻihau.

Hawai'i Sign Language

Alongside 'Ōlelo Hawai'i, some Maoli (Native Hawaiians) spoke Hawai'i Sign Language (or HSL). Little is known about the language by Western academics and efforts are being made to preserve and revitalize the language.

Education

Hawaiian children are publicly educated under the same terms as any other children in the United States. In Hawaii, children are publicly educated by the Hawaiʻi State Department of Education. Under the administration of Governor Benjamin J. Cayetano from 1994 to 2002, the state's educational system established Hawaiian language immersion schools. In these schools, all subject courses are taught in the Hawaiian language and use native Hawaiian subject matter in curricula. These schools were created in the spirit of cultural preservation and are not exclusive to native Hawaiian children.

Native Hawaiians are eligible for an education from the Kamehameha Schools, established through the last will and testament of Bernice Pauahi Bishop of the Kamehameha Dynasty. The largest and wealthiest private school in the United States, Kamehameha Schools was intended to benefit orphans and the needy, with preference given to native Hawaiians. The Kamehameha Schools educates thousands of children of entire and part native Hawaiian ancestry at its campuses during the regular school year, and also has summer and off-campus programs that are not restricted by ancestry. Kamehameha Schools' practice of accepting primarily gifted students, in lieu of intellectually challenged children, has been a controversial topic amongst the native Hawaiian community. Many families feel that the gifted students could excel at any learning institution, public or private, and that the Hawaiian community may be better served by educating children from high-risk, high-crime districts so that a greater proportion of disadvantaged youths may grow up to be responsible community contributors.

As with other children in Hawaiʻi, some native Hawaiians are educated by other prominent private academies in the Aloha State. They include: Punahou School, Saint Louis School, Mid-Pacific Institute, and ʻIolani School.

Native Hawaiian ways of learning

Native Hawaiians exemplify patterns of observational learning, a model that captures seven interrelated descriptions, or facets, of learning found in Indigenous communities in the Americas. Native Hawaiian views on learning flow from three basic tenets that correspond directly to the observational learning model: "I ka nānā no a ʻike: by observing, one learns. I ka hoʻolohe no a hoʻomaopopo: by listening, one commits to memory. I ka hana no a ʻike: by practice one masters the skill."

Learner collaboration and contribution

Similar to the indigenous communities of the Americas, Native Hawaiian children contribute alongside the adults, and the adults' presence is there to offer support. In most Native Hawaiian communities, household work tasks, such as ironing and cooking, etc., play a major role in contributing to the home life and children's participation enhances their importance within the family. Native Hawaiian children have shared aspirations to accomplish collaborative tasks, and they individually take initiative to work together. Children absorb very early the community-wide belief that hana (work) is respected and laziness is shameful. The phrase "E hoʻohuli ka lima i lalo" (The palms of the hands should be turned down) was used to communicate the idea that idleness (associated with upturned palms) was to be avoided.

Collaborative and flexible ensembles

Native Hawaiian children cooperate with flexible leadership to combine their skills, ideas, and abilities, like that found in observational learning in the indigenous communities of the Americas. Family organization is a "shared-function" system that includes flexible roles and fluid responsibility within the group. Basic family values include interdependence, responsibility for others, sharing of work and resources, obedience, and respect. Children assume important family responsibilities early and act as members of a sibling workforce that is held collectively responsible for completing tasks.

Children also take initiative to help others in the classroom. It has been observed that when children are working in a group with their peers and face difficulty, they will scan the room for an adult to assist or turn to their close fellows to either ask for help. Children also scan to provide help to others when necessary. In this way, children shift between the roles of assisted and assistant. Adults were present and available, but the children were more often found to take the initiative to learn from, and teach, one another how to perform tasks such as sweeping, homework, and caring for younger siblings.

Learning to transform participation

Among Native Hawaiians, the goal of learning is to transform participation to encompass conscientious accountability as active contributing members of the community, like that found in Learning by Observing and Pitching In (LOPI). For example, in some Native Hawaiian communities, parent(s) teach the older siblings the necessary skills of care taking. Sibling care-taking skills can relate to indigenous American ways of learning by the children becoming considerate of their parents and taking on the responsibility when needed in case of a tragic incident with the parents. Within the classroom and home settings, adults are present but are not always directly monitoring the children. Children ask for help when necessary, but adults appear to rarely interject. Children appeared to adapt to tasks and situations by observations and go off on their own to collectively work out how and what to do to complete the task.

Assuming and initiating care has been found across Polynesian cultures, and Native Hawaiian practices are in keeping with this trend. One study observed, interviewed, and evaluated families on the Polynesian Island Sikaiana and found that fostering children from other families within the community is a common shared endeavor that serves to construct relationships, support the community, and nurture compassion and sympathy (aloha). As children mature within the family, they go through a process of having their needs attended and learn to provide and care for the younger children alongside the adults. Adolescent girls who are active caretakers are referred to as parents, even if there is no biological connection.

Wide and keen attention for contribution

The Hawaiians' ways of learning include wide keen attention from the children while adults are available for guidance, also found in the model of Learning by Observing and Pitching In. Children were found to learn from adults by participating in group activities where they had the chance to observe the performance of more experienced participants as well as having errors in their own performance corrected by more seasoned group members. Because the children learn through observation, and then are encouraged to practice among their peers, we can speculate the children have keen attention to events around them, which is an expectation of adults and community members who are there to assist when needed. It has been observed that Hawaiian children were successful at completing tasks which greatly depend on visual and memory process skills, which coincides with Hawaiian mother's frequent use of non-verbal communication.

Coordination through shared reference

In some Native Hawaiian communities, there is a constant use of "talk story" which plays an essential role in promoting solidarity in the community by not overpowering or making the members of the community feel inadequate for not understanding something. Talk story can consist of recalled events, folktales, and joking. Joking can be used to tease and guide the children about how to do a chore better or to avoid serious trouble. Talk story relates to an Indigenous way of learning by providing conversations such as narratives and dramatizations with verbal and nonverbal communication between the elder and children.

Another example of verbal communication in the Native Hawaiian culture is through the use of chanting, which can allow a child to understand the relationship of their present experiences to those of their ancestors, both alive and deceased. Chanting also allows children to understand the connections of their chants to mother earth. For instance, chanting can voice the need for rain to produce plants and induce ponds to grow fish for harvest.

A study comparing Midwestern and Hawaiian mother – Kindergartener pairs presented with a novel task, found Hawaiian mothers to be much lower than their Midwestern counterparts in the use of verbal-control techniques and much higher in non-verbal communication, a finding which implies coordination through non-verbal and verbal means. Aspects of togetherness, continuity, purpose, and significance are a part of learning and coincide with the Native Hawaiian's spiritual connection to earth and environment.

Feedback that appraises mastery and support for learning

There is verbal and nonverbal guidance from parents to children with chores and other activities. For example, a pat on the shoulder can communicate to the child that he/she is doing the activity at hand the correct way. This example relates to the LOPI model by there being an appraisal from the parent(s) in order to support their progress in learning and contributing better in the community. As the child gradually advances towards more complex tasks, the goal of mastery and feedback on the adequacy of their contributions become more pronounced.

In the context of producing objects e.g. baskets, mats, or quilts, there was a belief that a child must produce a perfect end-product before moving on to learn the skills of producing something else. Perfection in these products was judged by more experienced craftspeople and was attained by repeated attempts interspersed with feedback. The perfected final products were kept as a special reminder and never used. Their production was seen as a necessary first step in "clearing the way" for other products to come; an indication of mastery for that skill set. Throughout several research articles, it becomes clear that many of the Native Hawaiian ways of learning resemble the defining characteristics of LOPI, which is common in many Indigenous communities of the Americas.

Office of Hawaiian Affairs

Another important outgrowth of the 1978 Hawaiʻi State Constitutional Convention was the establishment of the Office of Hawaiian Affairs, more popularly known as OHA. Delegates that included future Hawaiʻi political stars Benjamin J. Cayetano, John D. Waihee III, and Jeremy Harris created measures intended to address injustices toward native Hawaiians since the overthrow of the Kingdom of Hawaiʻi in 1893. OHA was established as a trust, administered with a mandate to better the conditions of both native Hawaiians and the Hawaiian community in general. OHA was given control over certain public lands, and continues to expand its land-holdings to this day (most recently with Waimea Valley, previously Waimea Falls Park).

Besides purchases since its inception, the lands initially given to OHA were originally crown lands of the Kingdom of Hawaiʻi used to pay the expenses of the monarchy (later held by the Provisional Government following the fall of the monarchy in 1893). Upon the declaration of the Republic of Hawaiʻi, they were officially designated as public lands. They were ceded to federal control with the establishment of the Territory of Hawaiʻi in 1898, and finally returned to the State of Hawaiʻi as public lands in 1959.

OHA is a semi-autonomous government body administered by a nine-member board of trustees, elected by the people of the State of Hawaiʻi through popular suffrage. Originally, trustees and the people eligible to vote for trustees were restricted to native Hawaiians. Rice v. Cayetano—suing the state to allow non-Hawaiians to sit on the board of trustees, and for non-Hawaiians to be allowed to vote in trustee elections—reached the United States Supreme Court, which ruled in favor of Rice on February 23, 2000, forcing OHA to open its elections to all residents of the State of Hawaiʻi, regardless of ethnicity.

Federal developments

United States annexation
In 1893, after the ascension of Queen Liliuokalani to the Hawaiian Throne in 1891, Sanford Dole created the "Committee of Safety" to overthrow the monarchy. This was in part due to the rejection of the 1887 Constitution by Queen Liliuokalani, which had severely limited the authority of the traditional Hawaiian monarch. See Overthrow of the Hawaiian Kingdom . This led to the diminishment of traditional governance and the installment of a US-backed, sugar baron government that was set on maximizing land-based profit on the island. This is not the first major US government involvement, see Hawaiian rebellions (1887–1895), but marked one of the biggest shifts in policy. Many have speculated that the coup was due to Kalākaua's unwillingness to sign the amended Treaty of Reciprocity which would have hurt Hawaiian trade, and opened up part of the island for the Pearl Harbor based military installation.

The United States coup would be bolstered by the usage of the US Marines and despite being challenged by Grover Cleveland, would eventually be supported by President McKinley in his "Manifest Destiny" plan, which was both harmful to indigenous peoples in the continental United States and the unceded Kingdom of Hawai'i. Overall, this coup left Native Hawaiians as the only major indigenous group with no "nation-to-nation" negotiation method and without any form of self determination.

Native American Programs Act
In 1974, the Native American Programs Act was amended to include native Hawaiians. This paved the way for native Hawaiians to become eligible for some, but not all, federal assistance programs originally intended for Continental Native Americans. Today, Title 45 CFR Part 1336.62 defines a Native Hawaiian as "an individual any of whose ancestors were natives of the area which consists of the Hawaiian Islands prior to 1778".

There is some controversy as to whether or not native Hawaiians should be considered in the same light as Native Americans.

United States apology resolution
On November 23, 1993, U.S. President Bill Clinton signed United States Public Law 103–150, also known as the Apology Resolution, which had previously passed Congress. This resolution "apologizes to Native Hawaiians on behalf of the people of the United States for the overthrow of the Kingdom of Hawaii".

Native Hawaiian Government Reorganization Act of 2009
In the early 2000s, the Congressional delegation of the State of Hawaiʻi introduced the Native Hawaiian Federal Recognition Bill, beginning the process of recognizing and forming a Native Hawaiian government entity to negotiate with state and federal governments. The significance of the bill is that it would establish, for the first time in the history of the islands, a new political and legal relationship between a Native Hawaiian entity and the federal government. This Native Hawaiian entity would be a newly created one without any historical precedent in the islands, or direct institutional continuity with previous political entities (unlike many Native American Indian groups, for example).

This bill came under scrutiny by the Bush administration's Department of Justice, as well as the United States Senate Judiciary Committee. The political context surrounding the Akaka Bill is both controversial and complex. Proponents, who consider the legislation an acknowledgement and partial correction of past injustices, include Hawaiʻi's Congressional delegation, as well as the former Republican Governor, Linda Lingle. Opponents include the U.S. Commission on Civil Rights, (who question the constitutionality of creating race-based governments), libertarian activists, (who challenge the historical accuracy of any claims of injustice), and other Native Hawaiian sovereignty activists, (who feel the legislation would thwart their hopes for complete independence from the United States).

A Ward Research poll commissioned in 2003 by the Office of Hawaiian Affairs reported that "Eighty-six percent of the 303 Hawaiian residents polled by Ward Research said 'yes.' Only 7 percent said 'no,' with 6 percent unsure ... Of the 301 non-Hawaiians polled, almost eight in 10 (78 percent) supported federal recognition, 16 percent opposed it, with 6 percent unsure." A Zogby International poll commissioned in 2009 by the Grassroot Institute of Hawaii indicated that a plurality (39%) of Hawaiʻi residents opposed the Native Hawaiian Reorganization Act of 2009, and that 76% indicated that they were unwilling to pay higher taxes to cover any loss in tax revenues that might be incurred by the act.

Ka Huli Ao: Center for Excellence in Native Hawaiian Law
In 2005, with the support of U.S. Senator Daniel Inouye, federal funding through the Native Hawaiian Education Act created the Center for Excellence in Native Hawaiian Law at the University of Hawaiʻi at Mānoa's William S. Richardson School of Law. A few years later, the program became known as Ka Huli Ao: Center for Excellence in Native Hawaiian Law. The inaugural director of Ka Huli Ao is Honolulu attorney Melody Kapilialoha MacKenzie, who was the chief editor of the Native Hawaiian Rights Handbook, which describes Native Hawaiian law.

Ka Huli Ao focuses on research, scholarship, and community outreach. Ka Huli Ao provides a monthly lunch-time discussion forum referred to as Maoli Thursday, which is free and open to the public. Ka Huli Ao maintains its own blog, as well as a Twitter account and a Facebook group. Ka Huli Ao also provides law students with summer fellowships. Law school graduates are eligible to apply for post-J.D. fellowships that last for one year.

Department of Interior Self-Governance Proposal
In 2016, the Department of Interior (DOI), under the direction of Secretary Jewell and President Obama, started the process of recognizing the Hawaiians’ right to self governance and the ability for nation-to-nation negotiation status and rights. This created opposition from those who did not believe that Native Hawaiians should have to go through US structures to regain sovereignty as well as saw the US attempts as being an "incomplete path to Hawaiian independence and nationhood". The final verdict of 2016 allowed for nation-to-nation relationships if Native Hawaiians created their own government and sought that relationship. Ultimately the naming of delegates and recognition of the results for the new government was stopped by Justice Kennedy, using his earlier precedent in Rice v. Cayetano that "ancestry was a proxy for race" in ancestry based elections, but the voting itself was not stopped (see: United States federal recognition of Native Hawaiians).

Violence Against Women Act
In December 2022, the Violence Against Women Act was amended, so as to include Native Hawaiian survivors of gender-based violence and Native Hawaiian organizations in Violence Against Women Act grant funding.

Notable Native Hawaiians

In 1873, the first native Hawaiians were given permission from King Lunalilo (prior emigration of native Hawaiians was not allowed) to permanently emigrate to the United States (Salt Lake City, Utah) whose names were Kiha Kaʻawa, and Kahana Pukahi. Kiha was adopted by Mormon Missionary President George Nebeker immediately upon arrival making Kiha Kaʻawa (Nebeker) the first native Hawaiian to become a U.S. citizen in 1873.

See also

 Culture of Hawaii
 Hawaiian home land
 Hawaiian kinship
 Hawaiian sovereignty movement
 History of Hawaii
 Population history of indigenous peoples of the Americas

References

Further reading
 Maenette K. Nee-Benham and Ronald H. Heck, Culture and Educational Policy in Hawaiʻi: The Silencing of Native Voices, Lawrence Erlbaum Associates, Inc., 1998
 Scott Cunningham, Hawaiian Magic and Spirituality, Llewellyn Worldwide, Ltd., 2000
 Rona Tamiko Tamiko Halualani, In the Name of Hawaiians: Native Identities and Cultural Politics, University of Minnesota Press, 2002
 Marshall D. Sahlins, How Natives Think: About Captain Cook, for Example, University of Chicago Press, 1995
 Thomas G. Thrum, Hawaiian Folk Tales: A Collection of Native Legends, International Law & Taxation Publishers, 2001
 Thomas G. Thrum, More Hawaiian Folk Tales: A Collection of Native Legends and Traditions, International Law & Taxation Publishers, 2001
 Houston Wood, Displacing Natives: The Rhetorical Production of Hawaiʻi, Rowman & Littlefield Publishers, Inc., 1999
 Kanalu G. Terry Young Rethinking the Native Hawaiian Past, Taylor & Francis, Inc., 1998
  Alt URL
  Alt URL

External links

 Office of Hawaiian Affairs (OHA)
 Council for Native Hawaiian Advancement
 Ka Huli Ao Center for Excellence in Native Hawaiian Law official website
 Ka Huli Ao Blog
 

Native Hawaiian
Native Hawaiian people
Ethnic groups in the United States
Indigenous peoples of Polynesia

Oceanian American
Pacific Islands American
Polynesian American
American culture